Amy Grant is an American politician,  and a Republican member of the Illinois House of Representatives for the 42nd district. The district, located in DuPage County, and includes all or parts of Carol Stream, Lisle, Warrenville, Wheaton, Winfield, West Chicago, and Naperville.

Grant, of Wheaton, was a member of the DuPage County Board at the time of her election to the Illinois House of Representatives. Prior to moving to Illinois, Grant was a teacher in Pittsburgh, Pennsylvania.

As of July 3, 2022, Representative Grant was a member of the following Illinois House committees:

 Adoption & Child Welfare Committee (HACW)
 Citizen Impact Subcommittee (HMAC-CITI)
 Human Services Committee (HHSV)
 Judiciary - Criminal Committee (HJUC)
 Mental Health & Addiction Committee (HMEH)
 Museums, Arts, & Cultural Enhancement Committee (HMAC)
 Special Issues (HS) Subcommittee (HHSV-SPIS)

Controversy 
Amy Grant was recorded making remarks some fellow legislators called racist and homophobic, according to the Chicago Sun-Times and other newspapers. She was quoted referring to her opponent Ken Mejia-Beal, who is Black and openly gay, saying "That's all we need is another person on the Black Caucus" in one clip and "Not because he’s Black, but because of the way he talks — he’s all LGBTQ" in another.

Electoral history

References

External links
 Elect Amy Grant official campaign website

Year of birth missing (living people)
21st-century American politicians
21st-century American women politicians
Democratic Party members of the Illinois House of Representatives
People from Wheaton, Illinois
University of Pittsburgh alumni
Women state legislators in Illinois
County board members in Illinois
Educators from Pennsylvania
American women educators
Living people
Educators from Illinois